Yawan may refer to:

 Yawan District, Afghanistan
 Javan, the fourth son of Noah's third son Japheth
 Peba–Yaguan languages, a language family in the northwestern Amazon